is the ninth single by Japanese band Antic Cafe. The title track is featured on the album Magnya Carta. The song peaked at No. 39 on the Japanese singles chart.

Track listing
 "Bonds ~Kizuna~" (BondS～絆～) - 4:52
 "Go!!Go!!Go!!" - 4:14

References

An Cafe songs
2006 singles
2006 songs
Loop Ash Records singles
Songs written by Kanon (bassist)